Chengshan Road is an interchange station on Lines 8 and 13 of the Shanghai Metro. This station opened as part of the southern extension of Line 8 on 5 July 2009. It became an interchange station with the opening of phases two and three of Line 13 on 30 December 2018. The station is located in Shanghai's Pudong New Area.

Station Layout

References 

Railway stations in Shanghai
Line 8, Shanghai Metro
Line 13, Shanghai Metro
Shanghai Metro stations in Pudong
Railway stations in China opened in 2009